FIBA Oceania Youth Tournament is a basketball tournament that debuted in 1997 and then took place every two years between 1998 and 2010. It featured under-20 national teams with the Oceania region.

Summaries

Participating nations

See also

References

External links
 FIBA Oceania

Oceania
Basketball competitions in Oceania between national teams